The Fairwell is a rock supergroup from Memphis, Tennessee, formerly consisting of Zach Myers of Shinedown, Chris Allen of Ingram Hill, Zach Kirk  of Ingram Hill/Perspective, Michael McManus of 12 Stones/Saving Abel. The band released their last album titled "Schizophrenic love songs" January 8th 2021

History 
The band was founded by lead singer and guitarist Zach Myers, a Beale Street based, internationally touring blues artist from age 14. He is also a lead and rhythm guitarist for multi-platinum band Shinedown.  The other band members have changed over the years, with the notable exception of long-time and current guitarist and vocalist Chris Allen, who played and started a fanbase on Beale Street at an early age, having joined in 2008.  The group has opened for dozens of major recording artists including 3 Doors Down and Hinder, and has appeared in numerous magazine, radio, television appearances, as recently as March 24, 2008 on CBS televisions "Live at 9".

Discography
The band finally completed recording of their debut album, "Schizophrenic Love Songs - Part I" in March 2008, with producer Skidd Mills (Skillet, 12 Stones, Saliva).  The album was in and out of production over the course of several years, with much industry hype, even while some believed that it would never be completed due to Zach's obligations to Shinedown. In a 2011 interview, Myers said of the album's release, "It's been finished for a while. If it's released, it's released. We're all in other big name bands now, so it's become more of a side project." The album was released in January 8'th, 2021.

Band members
Zach Myers - lead vocals, guitar, piano
Chris Allen - guitar, vocals, Piano
Zach Kirk - bass
Zack Smith - guitar

References

External links
 The Fairwell on Myspace

Rock music groups from Tennessee
Musical groups from Memphis, Tennessee